Gunnar Andersson (14 August 1928 – 1 October 1969) was a Swedish footballer who played as a striker. He is widely considered one of Olympique de Marseille's best strikers, and is the highest scorer of the club. Born in Sweden, he represented the France national football B team once.

Career
Andersson started his career in Sweden, where he was nicknamed Säffle, before playing for Danish side Kjøbenhavns BK before being transferred to Olympique de Marseille, where he became a key player. Having scored 194 goals in 220 matches, he is the highest scorer of the club ahead of Jean-Pierre Papin (182) and Josip Skoblar (176). With l'OM he was also Division 1 top goalscorer in 1951–1952 and 1952–1953 and runner-up in the 1953–54 Coupe de France. He also played for other French teams such as FC Girondins de Bordeaux and AS Aix.

Despite his success in France, he never played for the Sweden national football team because of a policy not to select players based outside Sweden, such as Andersson and Gunnar Nordahl. However, as he obtained French citizenship in 1954, he was capped once for the France B team in 1956, but was disappointing and was never called again.

He died in 1969, as he was heading to Stade Vélodrome, to see a match against Dukla Prague in the 1969–70 European Cup Winners' Cup. He remains today one of the best players to wear l'OM uniform and one of the most appreciated by supporters.

Honours
Marseille
 Coupe de France runner-up: 1954
 Coupe Charles Drago: 1957

Individual
 Division 1 top goalscorer: 1951–1952, 1952–1953

References

External links
 Article and photos on a Olympique de Marseille fan site
 Article on Gunnar Andersson http://mondediplo.com/2003/02/15soccer

1928 births
1969 deaths
People from Arvika Municipality
French footballers
France B international footballers
Swedish footballers
Swedish emigrants to France
French people of Swedish descent
Association football forwards
Ligue 1 players
IK Arvika players
IFK Göteborg players
Kjøbenhavns Boldklub players
Olympique de Marseille players
Montpellier HSC players
FC Girondins de Bordeaux players
Pays d'Aix FC players
Expatriate footballers in France
Expatriate men's footballers in Denmark
Sportspeople from Värmland County